Seán McCarthy (1889 – 14 March 1974) was an Irish Fianna Fáil politician. A teacher by profession, he was first elected to Dáil Éireann as a Fianna Fáil Teachta Dála (TD) for the Cork South-East constituency at the 1944 general election but lost his seat at the 1948 general election running in the Cork Borough constituency. He was re-elected for the Cork Borough constituency at the 1951 general election. McCarthy was elected from the Cork South constituency at the 1954 Irish general election and the 1957 Irish general election. The last time McCarthy was elected was to represent the Cork Mid constituency at the 1961 Irish general election..

McCarthy also served as Lord Mayor of Cork on four occasions, from 1949 to 1951, 1958 to 1959, 1963 to 1964 and 1966 to 1967.

He was president of the Gaelic Athletic Association from 1932 to 1935.

References

 
 

1889 births
1974 deaths
Fianna Fáil TDs
Irish schoolteachers
Irish sportsperson-politicians
Lord Mayors of Cork
Members of the 12th Dáil
Members of the 14th Dáil
Members of the 15th Dáil
Members of the 16th Dáil
Members of the 17th Dáil
Presidents of the Gaelic Athletic Association
Alumni of De La Salle Teacher Training College, Waterford